Robert Sullivan may refer to:

Robert Sullivan (judoka) (born 1949), British Olympic judoka
Robert Sullivan (poet) (born 1967), Māori writer from New Zealand
Robert Sullivan (reporter), associated with The New Yorker
Robert Austin Sullivan (1947–1983), American man executed in Florida
Robert Baldwin Sullivan (1802–1853), Canadian lawyer, judge, and the second Mayor of Toronto
Robert J. Sullivan Jr. (born 1945), American politician
Robert Joseph Sullivan, American football player
Robert Joseph Sullivan (educator) (1800–1868), Northern Irish educationalist, founder of Sullivan Upper School, author of English texts and dictionaries.
Robbie Sullivan, fictional character in the television series Modern Family
Bobby Sullivan, musician and activist
Robert Michael Sullivan, paleontologist, Senior Curator of Paleontology and Geology at the State Museum of Pennsylvania

See also
Bob Sullivan (disambiguation)
Robert O'Sullivan (disambiguation)